Princess Qhabl Begum Sahiba Esra Birgen (born 1936) is a princess belonging to the Asaf Jah Dynasty of Hyderabad state by marriage. She was married to Prince Mukarram Jah. Princess Esra is a princess by marriage, not by birth.

She is credited with the restoration of the Chowmahalla and Falaknuma palaces. The former was opened to the public while the latter was leased as a luxury hotel to the Taj Group.

Personal life
Princess Esra married Prince Mukkaram Jah in 1959. They were married for 15 years. They have a son Azmet (born 1962) and a daughter Shekhya (born 1964). She lives in London.

Palace restoration
Princess Esra is credited with the restoration of Chowmahalla Palace  and Falaknuma Palace.

She appointed architect Rahul Mehrotra to restore the Chowmahalla Palace.

She initiated a project for the royal palaces in August 2000. The restoration project for Chowmahalla Palace involved tasks ranging from stabilising the existing structural components to reconstitution of collapsed and dilapidated sections of the complex, restoration of external and internal spaces and of decorative elements and finishes.

References

External links
 Princess to the Rescue - William Darlymple on Princess Esra

Women from Hyderabad State
Living people
1936 births
Date of birth missing (living people)
People from Hyderabad State
Indian female royalty
20th-century Indian royalty